Pascal Zaremba (born 2 September 1959) is a French former professional football player and manager.

Club career 
A youth graduate of Valenciennes, Zaremba was a versatile centre-back and defensive midfielder in his playing days. He notably scored from a free-kick in the 1983 Coupe de France Final for Paris Saint-Germain in a 3–2 win over Nantes.

International career 
Zaremba was a U21 international for France. He also played for the France B team.

Managerial career 
Zaremba retired from football in 1994. He initially went to coach children in the Valenciennes youth academy before becoming the U17 team's coach in 1997. He stayed in this role from only July to December 1997, and became the assistant manager for the Valenciennes B team in January 1998.

In June 1998, Zaremba left his role as B team assistant to become assistant for the senior A team of the club. In 2001, he returned to the B team as assistant coach.

Personal life 
Pascal's older brother Bruno was also a footballer.

Honours 
Paris Saint-Germain
 Coupe de France: 1982–83

References

External links 
 

1959 births
Living people
French footballers
French football managers
Sportspeople from Nord (French department)
Association football defenders
Association football midfielders
Valenciennes FC players
Paris Saint-Germain F.C. players
RC Lens players
Le Havre AC players
AS Nancy Lorraine players
AS Beauvais Oise players
Ligue 1 players
Ligue 2 players
Footballers from Hauts-de-France